Charles Davidson Bell FRSE (22 October 1813 – 7 April 1882) was the Surveyor-General in the Cape Colony, an artist, heraldist, and designer of Cape medals and stamps.

Life history
Born on 22 October 1813 at Newhall, Crail, Fife, Scotland, he was educated locally at St Andrews University.

Bell left Scotland and sailed to South Africa, landing at the Cape of Good Hope in 1830 and through his uncle Sir John Bell, Secretary to the Cape Government, was given a post in the civil service. He was appointed as expedition artist on Dr. Andrew Smith's two-year journey north as far as the Limpopo in 1834. He went from Acting Clerk of the Legislative Council in 1838, to Assistant Surveyor-General in 1843, to Surveyor-General in 1848.

In 1851, he designed a silver gallantry medal for Cape governor Sir Harry Smith to present to troops during the 8th Frontier War. This is often referred to as the first South African medal.

Appointed to the Postal Enquiry Board in 1852, he designed the well-known Cape of Good Hope triangular stamp, the first of that shape, which became extremely rare and consequently much sought after by philatelists. His design of rectangular stamps remained in use until 1902.

Many of his sketches and paintings show a whimsical sense of humour, though his sensitive portrayals of the mixed population of Cape Town and of the tribes he encountered on the Smith expedition to the north, have become an invaluable record of life in 19th-century South Africa. The return of many of his paintings from England to South Africa in 1978, gave art historians a fresh appreciation of his work and greater insight into that period of Cape history. However, in his essay "Alcohol and Art", Russel Viljoen, professor in history at the University of South Africa wrote:

Bell also made an important contribution to heraldry in South Africa. Throughout his residence at the Cape, he copied old Dutch/Afrikaner coats of arms from memorials, seals, stained glass windows, and other artefacts, and in 1861 he advertised his intention of publishing them in book form. The book did not see the light of day, but he later gave the manuscript, the drawings, and his notes to his brother-in-law Daniel Krynauw. Krynauw built up his own heraldry collection, and after his death, the two collections were placed in a Cape Town museum, from where they were transferred to the South African Library (now National Library of South Africa – Cape Town Campus) in 1946. The material in the Bell-Krynauw Collection was eventually published in Cornelis Pama's Die Wapens van die Ou Afrikaanse Families (1959), and his later heraldry books.

Bell designed the arms of the South African College (now University of Cape Town), and the "three anchors" badge of the South African Mutual Life Assurance Society ("Old Mutual"), of which he was chairman at one time. Both emblems are still in use, and may well be the oldest academic arms and corporate logo in South Africa.

Bell was a founder member and chairman of the South African Mutual Life Assurance Society. He was awarded a gold medal in 1851 for his oil painting depicting the Landing of van Riebeeck at the Cape of Good Hope. A large number of his originals hang in the Library of Parliament in Cape Town, the University of the Witwatersrand and the Africana Museum in Johannesburg. The book Travels in the Interior of South Africa (1868) by James Chapman, was illustrated by Bell. His Reports of the Surveyor-General, Charles D. Bell Esq., on the copper fields of Little Namaqualand (1855) was written after a three-month visit to the area. He gave his name to the town of Bellville in the Cape, and Bell, a small village between Peddie and Hamburg, near the mouth of the Keiskamma River in the Eastern Cape.

John Bell was a traveller and the eldest son of Charles Davidson Bell. Between 1861 and 1862 he accompanied Henry Samuel Chapman from Cape Town to Walvis Bay, through Hereroland to Lake Ngami and back to the Cape Colony via Shoshong, Kuruman and Hopetown. He was married to Margaret Roome in 1865 and died in 1878 in England.

Charles Bell was a friend of Andrew Geddes Bain and was a pall-bearer at his funeral in 1864. After his retirement in 1872 he returned to Scotland in 1873 with Helena and their 3 surviving children, where Helena Bell died on 10 September 1881 and he died on 7 April 1882.

Family life

Bell married Martha Antoinette Ebden on 3 June 1841.
John Alexander Bell born 25 January 1843 in Grahamstown
Charles David Ebden Bell born 1 August 1845 in Cape Town
Catherine Mariann Bell born 16 December 1848 at Canigou, Rondebosch, Cape Town died 16 July 1863
Charles Bell divorced Martha Ebden on 1 July 1850 having cited Dr. Lestock Wilson Stewart as co-respondent. Court granted Charles Bell custody of the three children – Martha gave birth to second daughter Charlotte Margaret on 17 October 1850 – Bell denied paternity. Charlotte Margaret died before 10 April 1866.

Bell's second marriage to Helena Krynauw on 7 July 1859.
Helena Isabella Bell born 31 May 1860 in Cape Town
Alexander Bell born 15 September 1861 in Cape Town
Anthony Bell born 9 February 1863 in Cape Town
David Duncan Traill Bell born 21 April 1864 Cape Town died 14 December 1865
Catherine Susan Bell born 11 May 1865 Cape Town died 13 September 1865

Notes and references 

Standard Encyclopaedia of Southern Africa (vol.2) (NASOU Cape Town 1970)
The Life and Work of Charles Bell – Phillida Brooke Simons (Fernwood Press, Cape Town 1998) 
Die Wapens van die Ou Afrikaanse Families – C. Pama (1959)
Heraldry of South African Families – C. Pama (1972)
Die Groot Afrikaanse Familienaamboek – C. Pama (1983).

External links

South African surveyors-general
South African heraldry
1813 births
1882 deaths
19th-century South African painters
South African male painters
19th-century male artists